Rushing Silver (早繰り銀 hayakuri gin, also Rapid Advancing Silver) is a shogi attacking strategy.

Rushing Silver involves advancing the right offensive silver upward through an opening in the pawn line created by a pushed pawn on the third file to rest on the fourth file and subsequently moving the silver diagonally to attack the opponent either on the third file or across the third file to attack on the second file (in which case it appears to be similar formally to the Diagonal Climbing Silver attack used by Static Rook positions against Ranging Rook opponents).

Different Static Rook shogi openings may include a Rushing Silver attack. It is particularly popular to use with the Bishop Exchange opening.

Example

The adjacent diagrams show a possible Rushing Silver attack for Black through the third file and aim to trade off the pawns and silvers on the second file. The opponent (White) has their king partially castled on the 31 square with a variant of the Helmut Yagura castle which is typical of Bishop Exchange positions.

Extreme Rushing Silver

Professional shogi player,  Shin'ichi Satō has developed a set of related strategies known as the Extreme Rushing Silver (極限早繰り銀) opening.

See also

 Bishop Exchange, Rushing Silver
 Climbing Silver
 Reclining Silver
 Shogi opening
 Shogi strategy

References

Bibliography

 
 
 佐藤, 慎一 [Satō, Shin'ichi]. 2018. 極限早繰り銀. マイナビ出版.

External links

 HIDETCHI's YouTube videos:
 Bishop Exchange #1
 Bishop Exchange #2
 Bishop Exchange #3

Shogi openings
Static Rook openings